Cojocaru, a common Romanian family name that refers to one who makes the cojoc jacket, may refer to one of the following:

Alina Cojocaru, Romanian ballet dancer
Alina Carmen Cojocaru, mathematician
Cristieana Cojocaru, Romanian athlete
Doina Cojocaru, Romanian handball player
Ido Kozikaro, Israeli basketball player
Maxim Cojocaru, Moldovan footballer
Sabina Cojocar, Romanian gymnast
Steven Cojocaru, Canadian fashion critic
Valentin Cojocaru, Romanian football player
Ziv Cojocaru, Israeli classical musician

it may also refer to:

Cojocaru River in Romania
Cojocaru, a village in Mogoșani Commune, Dâmboviţa County, Romania

See also 
Cojoc

Romanian-language surnames
Occupational surnames